USS Kingbird (AMS-194) was a  acquired by the United States Navy for clearing coastal minefields.

Construction
The second ship to be named Kingbird was laid down 26 February 1954, as AMS-194; launched 21 May 1954 by the Quincy Adams Yacht Yard, Inc., Quincy, Massachusetts; sponsored by Mrs. Marion Cushman Wilson; reclassified MSC-194 on 7 February 1955; and commissioned on 27 April 1955.

East Coast operations 
After shakedown, Kingbird arrived Charleston, South Carolina, for minesweep training and for the entire year she perfected methods of detecting and destroying mines. She also participated in exercises which kept her ready for any service she might be called upon to perform. From 1956 through 1964, Kingbird engaged in minesweeping exercises along the Atlantic coast from Nova Scotia to the Panama Canal Zone in the Caribbean. During 1965, she displayed her versatility in two search operations: one for a downed Navy plane and the other a lost merchant ship. In 1967, she still operated out of Charleston.

Decommissioning 
Kingbird was struck from the Navy Register on 1 July 1972, and disposed of through the Defense Reutilization and Marketing Service for scrap, 1 March 1973.

Notes 

Citations

Bibliography 

Online resources

External links 
 

 

Bluebird-class minesweepers
Ships built in Quincy, Massachusetts
1954 ships
Cold War minesweepers of the United States
Adjutant-class minesweepers